Christian Klien (born 7 February 1983) is an Austrian former Formula One racing driver. In total he has scored 14 points in Formula One. Klien currently competes full-time in the GT World Challenge Europe for JP Motorsport.

Racing career
Born in Hohenems, Klien started his motorsport career in his early teens. He raced in karting championships in both Austria and Switzerland, before moving to Formula BMW. After winning several titles in lower Formulas, Klien moved into Formula One, driving for the Jaguar Racing team, alongside Mark Webber. At the end of 2004, however, Jaguar sold its Formula One team to Red Bull, which renamed it Red Bull Racing. In an unusual arrangement, Klien shared a race seat with Italian Vitantonio Liuzzi. He stayed at Red Bull for 2006, whilst Liuzzi moved to the Red Bull junior team, Scuderia Toro Rosso.

After an unsuccessful 2006, Klien's old teammate Mark Webber replaced him for the 2007 season, news Klien learned from Webber himself. Klien was offered alternatives to Formula One for 2007, including driving in the ChampCar series, but he refused and aimed for a seat in Formula One. He secured the test driver's seat at Honda, despite competition from other drivers, including Gary Paffett.

On 2 February 2008 Klien signed as BMW Sauber's reserve and test driver for the 2008 Formula One season, alongside Estonian Marko Asmer.

Pre-Formula One
Klien became enthused about racing when his dad brought him to watch a Go-Kart race. This enthusiasm for the sport was only increased after meeting Brazilian Formula One driver Ayrton Senna. The Austrian started his career at the age of 13. From 1996 to 1998, Klien won several kart races in both Switzerland and his native Austria, becoming the Suisse champion in his first year.

In 1999, Klien moved to racing in the Formula BMW ADAC Junior Cup, winning four races and finishing fourth in the series. The following year, he moved into the main Formula BMW ADAC Championship with Team Rosberg, finishing the series ranked tenth overall and third in the rookie rankings. Continuing in the series in 2001, Klien managed to win five races, and ended up third in the series. Joining JD Motorsport for the Italian winter Formula Renault series, he won one event, which led to a drive for the team in German Formula Renault for 2002.

Klien won four races, winning the German title, and finishing fifth in the European series. From there, Klien moved into the Formula Three Euroseries, with Mucke Motorsport, winning four races and finishing runner-up to Ryan Briscoe. Klien also won the 2003 Marlboro Masters event at Zandvoort.

Formula One

Jaguar (2004)

In December 2003, Klien was signed as a race driver for the Jaguar Formula One team for the 2004 season, replacing Justin Wilson, who had replaced Antônio Pizzonia for the final 5 Grand Prix of the 2003 season. He had significant pressure on him as second driver to his more experienced teammate Mark Webber, but was the first driver to ever outqualify Webber from the same team.

Klien proved to be considerably reliable over the season, retiring only on 4 occasions out of the possible 18. Klien's only points scoring finish in his debut season came in Belgium, where Klien finished sixth; scoring 3 Championship points. He finished alongside Cristiano da Matta and Nick Heidfeld in joint 16th in the Drivers' Championship.

Red Bull (2005–2006)

2005
Jaguar were bought out in November 2004 by Austrian energy drink company Red Bull and were renamed Red Bull Racing. During winter testing in 2005, Klien tested several times for Red Bull Racing alongside Vitantonio Liuzzi and David Coulthard. Klien secured the second race seat at Red Bull, alongside Coulthard. Klien started the year with points finishes in the first two races before retiring in Bahrain before the race had even started due to an electrical problem.

With both Klien and Liuzzi signed to race for the Red Bull team in 2005, Red Bull announced that Liuzzi would be racing at the next 4 rounds in San Marino, Spain, Monaco and the European Grands Prix instead of Klien. Originally, Klien was ineligible to be a third driver at these Grand Prix, as he had competed in over six Grand Prix the previous year, but after a majority of teams asked the FIA to remove this ruling, Klien was allowed to take this role at Imola.

The Austrian returned to the race seat for the Canadian Grand Prix and maintained his race seat thanks to his strong performances and Red Bull's increased number of seats from the purchase of the Minardi team (which was renamed Scuderia Toro Rosso, Italian for "Team Red Bull") in 2006. Klien finished his second year in Formula One with two further points finishes: an 8th-place finish in Turkey and a 5th at the season-finale in China. After a promising performance in China, it was confirmed in December 2005 that Klien would drive for the Red Bull Racing outfit alongside David Coulthard for the 2006 season.

2006

Klien started 2006 strongly, qualifying in the top 10 for the first 2 races of the season. In Bahrain he finished 8th, scoring a point. However, in Malaysia he collided with Kimi Räikkönen on the first lap and had to pit with suspension damage, before eventually dropping out with a hydraulic failure.

In 2006, Klien was unsuccessful in comparison to his more experienced teammate David Coulthard, as the Brit scored the team's first podium and was more consistent than Klien throughout the season. In August 2006, it was confirmed that Klien would not stay with the Red Bull team for the upcoming 2007 season, or at least as a race driver, due to Red Bull's signing of Mark Webber. After the 2 points finishes in Bahrain and Germany, there was some uncertainty as to where Klien would go next in his racing career, speculation suggested America as a logical choice for the Austrian, but he refused a ChampCar seat in a Red Bull-backed team for 2007, preferring to chase a Formula One drive with another team. As a result, the team announced that Klien had been dropped for the last three races of the season in favour of test driver Robert Doornbos.

Honda and BMW Sauber (2007–2009)

On 15 November 2006, Honda Racing announced the signing of Klien as their test and reserve driver for the 2007 season. The Austrian made his debut for the Japanese works team at the Circuit de Catalunya, during the early pre-season testing during late November 2006.  At the 2007 British Grand Prix, he replaced the injured Jenson Button for the second free practice session on Friday. On 11 July 2007, Klien was released by Honda F1 to test with Spyker with a view to replacing Christijan Albers who was released because of sponsorship problems. However, the seat went to Japanese driver Sakon Yamamoto.

In 2008 Klien signed as BMW Sauber's test and reserve driver for the  Formula One season. He also signed with Peugeot to race in 24 Hours of Le Mans. Driving the Peugeot 908 HDi FAP he finished third overall with Ricardo Zonta and Franck Montagny. In October he participated in Petit Le Mans in the American Le Mans Series, driving with Peugeot's factory drivers Marc Gené and Nicolas Minassian.

He also returned to Le Mans with Peugeot, finishing sixth overall in a 908 shared with Pedro Lamy and Minassian.

For , Klien was understood to be an option for Sauber before the seat went to Pedro de la Rosa.

HRT (2010)

Klien was then tipped to become Hispania Racing's reserve driver despite being second favourite to ex-US F1 man José María López but neither Klien or López got the seat. It went to former Super Aguri F1 and Spyker F1 driver Sakon Yamamoto. However, he was later signed by Hispania as well as Yamamoto. He replaced Chandhok again at the  where his session was made difficult by problems with his car. At the  he was confirmed as a replacement for the ill Sakon Yamamoto, marking his first grand prix since the 2006 Italian Grand Prix. He qualified in 22nd place, over a second ahead of team mate Bruno Senna, and ran just ahead of him in the race until a mechanical problem forced him to retire. He replaced Yamamoto for the final two races of the season in Brazil and Abu Dhabi, but the team did not retain his services into the  season.

Post-Formula One

After Formula One, Klien began racing in a number of categories including endurance racing, sports cars and V8 Supercars. He was close to a deal with Peugeot to race in the World Endurance Championship in 2012 before the French company withdrew from racing.

Klien has taken part in a number of V8 Supercar drives, including the Bathurst 1000 where he teamed up with Russell Ingall.

Since late 2012, Klien writes a monthly column for the Pitpass.com website.

In 2014, Klien signed a deal with NewBlood By Morand Racing to race in their 2014 ELMS campaign.

In 2017, Klien joined the Bundesheer (Austrian Armed Forces) and will continue his racing career in addition to military service.

Klien competed in the 2021 Deutsche Tourenwagen Masters part-time by driving a McLaren for the Polish JP Motorsport team in a total of three two-race rounds. After making his debut in the third round at Zolder, he returned to the grid in the next round at the Nürburgring and in the sixth round at Assen. His fifth-place finish in the first race at Assen was his only top-10 finish in six races.

In 2022 Klien continued racing GT3 machineries for JP Motorsport, making a switch to GT World Challenge Europe Endurance Cup and GT World Challenge Europe Sprint Cup.

Racing record

Career summary

† As Klien was a guest driver, he was ineligible to score points.
* Season still in progress.

Complete Formula 3 Euro Series results
(key)

Complete Formula One results
(key)

Sports/Touring car racing

Le Mans 24 Hours results

American Le Mans Series results

Complete European Le Mans Series results

1 Driver run for the Intercontinental Le Mans Cup, no points awarded for the Le Mans Series.

Complete V8 Supercar results

Complete Bathurst 1000 results

Complete International Superstars Series results
(key) (Races in bold indicate pole position) (Races in italics indicate fastest lap)

Complete Auto GP results
(key) (Races in bold indicate pole position) (Races in italics indicate fastest lap)

Complete FIA World Endurance Championship results

Complete Super GT results
(key) (Races in bold indicate pole position) (Races in italics indicate fastest lap)

Complete GT World Challenge Europe Sprint Cup results

Complete Deutsche Tourenwagen Masters results
(key) (Races in bold indicate pole position) (Races in italics indicate fastest lap)

† As Klien was a guest driver, he was ineligible to score points.

See also
 List of Austrians in sports
 Famous Austrians

References

All Formula One race and championship results are taken from:
 Official Formula 1 Website. Archive: Results for 2004 – Present seasons www.formula1.com Retrieved 6 June 2006

Footnotes

External links

 Christian Klien Official website
 Christian Klien Unofficial Forum
 Christian Klien profile and statistics
 Christian Klien statistics
 Christian Klien statistics at Driver Database. (includes pre-F1 career)

1983 births
Living people
People from Hohenems
Austrian racing drivers
Austrian Formula One drivers
German Formula Renault 2.0 drivers
Formula Renault Eurocup drivers
Formula 3 Euro Series drivers
Formula BMW ADAC drivers
24 Hours of Le Mans drivers
Jaguar Formula One drivers
Red Bull Formula One drivers
HRT Formula One drivers
American Le Mans Series drivers
European Le Mans Series drivers
Supercars Championship drivers
Superstars Series drivers
Auto GP drivers
V8SuperTourer drivers
Super GT drivers
Austrian military personnel
Sportspeople from Vorarlberg
Deutsche Tourenwagen Masters drivers
FIA World Endurance Championship drivers
Blancpain Endurance Series drivers
International GT Open drivers
ADAC GT Masters drivers
Team Rosberg drivers
JD Motorsport drivers
Mücke Motorsport drivers
Peugeot Sport drivers
Aston Martin Racing drivers
Morand Racing drivers
Kolles Racing drivers
Emil Frey Racing drivers
Engstler Motorsport drivers